The 1924 Vermont gubernatorial election took place on November 4, 1924. Incumbent Republican Redfield Proctor Jr., per the "Mountain Rule", did not run for re-election to a second term as Governor of Vermont. Republican candidate Franklin S. Billings defeated Democratic candidate Fred C. Martin to succeed him.

Republican primary

Results

Democratic primary

Results

General election

Results

References

Vermont
1924
Gubernatorial
November 1924 events